Penicillium vanluykii is a species of fungus in the genus Penicillium which produces penicillin.

References

vanluykii
Fungi described in 2012